Gabriel Charles Jean Le Bret (26 October 1872 – 23 December 1947) was a French sailor who represented his country at the 1900 Summer Olympics in Meulan, France. With Jacques Baudrier as helmsman and fellow crewmember William Martin, Jules Valton and Félix Marcotte Le Bret took the 2nd place in first race of the .5 to 1 ton and finished 3rd in the second race.

Further reading

References

External links

1872 births
1947 deaths
French male sailors (sport)
Olympic sailors of France
Sailors at the 1900 Summer Olympics – .5 to 1 ton
Medalists at the 1900 Summer Olympics
Sportspeople from Paris
Olympic silver medalists for France
Olympic bronze medalists for France
Olympic medalists in sailing